HMS Phaeton was one of eight  light cruisers built for the Royal Navy in the 1910s. She fought in the First World War, participating in the Battle of Jutland. Following the war, she was scrapped.

Design and description
The Arethusa-class cruisers were intended to lead destroyer flotillas and defend the fleet against attacks by enemy destroyers.

The main armament of the Arethusa-class ships was two BL 6-inch (152 mm) Mk XII guns that were mounted on the centreline fore and aft of the superstructure and six QF 4-inch Mk V guns in waist mountings. They were also fitted with a single QF 3-pounder  anti-aircraft gun and four  torpedo tubes in two twin mounts.

Construction and career

The ship was launched on 21 October 1914 at Vickers Limited's shipyard. On being commissioned, she was assigned to the 4th Light Cruiser Squadron of the Grand Fleet, and between February and March 1915 was operating in the Dardanelles in support of the Allied landings at Gallipoli. On Phaetons return to home waters, she was assigned to the 1st Light Cruiser Squadron of the Grand Fleet and by mid-April 1915 she was operating out of Scapa Flow. On 4 May 1916 she took part in shooting down the Zeppelin L 7.  On 31 May to 1 June 1916 Phaeton took part in the Battle of Jutland. She survived the First World War, and was sold for scrapping on 16 January 1923 to King, of Troon.

Notes

Bibliography

External links

Ships of the Arethusa class
Battle of Jutland Crew Lists Project - HMS Phaeton Crew List

Arethusa-class cruisers (1913)
1914 ships
World War I cruisers of the United Kingdom